Takarazuka can refer to

 Takarazuka, Hyōgo, a city in Hyōgo Prefecture, Japan
 Takarazuka Revue, a Japanese all-female theater troupe in Japan
 Takarazuka Grand Theater, the Revue's home theater in Takarazuka, Hyōgo
 Tokyo Takarazuka Theater, the Revue's theater in Tokyo
 Takarazuka Eiga, a film production company from Takarazuka Revue theater
 Takarazuka Kinen, a horse race in Japan